Wai Yan is one of the 29 constituencies in the Sai Kung District.

Created for the 2019 District Council elections, the constituency returns one district councillor to the Sai Kung District Council, with an election every four years.

Wai Yan loosely covers residential flats in Finery Park, Radiant Towers, Verbena Heights and Well On Garden in Po Lam. It has projected population of 13,752.

Councillors represented

Election results

2010s

慧茵

References

Po Lam
Constituencies of Hong Kong
Constituencies of Sai Kung District Council
2019 establishments in Hong Kong
Constituencies established in 2019